Charles Herbert Colvin (March 4, 1893 – July 3, 1985) was an aeronautical engineer who was the co-founder of the Pioneer Instrument Company in Brooklyn, with Brice Herbert Goldsborough and Morris M. Titterington.

Biography
Colvin was born in Sterling, Massachusetts in 1893 to Fred Herbert Colvin (1867-1965) and Mary K. Loring (1869-?). He co-founded the Pioneer Instrument Company in 1919, and sold the company in 1929 to the Bendix Corporation. In the early 1950s, he started Colvin Laboratories, which manufactured aeronautical instruments, in East Orange, New Jersey. He retired from business in 1963.

He married Bessie Colvin Davis (c1900-1956). After her death he married Marjorie Colvin Babcock. He had four children from his first marriage, two daughters, Margaret Colvin Tropp of Woodland Hills, California, and Elizabeth Colvin Davis of Madison, Wisconsin and two sons, David ("Gene") Colvin, of Old Lyme, Connecticut and Roger Colvin; a stepdaughter, Dagny Sellorin of Portland, Oregon; a brother, Henry Colvin, of Medford, New Jersey; at the time of his death he had seven grandchildren, and one great-grandchild, Caitlin Colvin. He died July 3, 1985 at St. Joseph Hospital in Ojai, California, after a long illness. He was 92 years old and had been living in Ojai.

Patent
 May 6, 1935; "Improvements in navigating and calculating apparatus for aircraft"

References in periodicals

The New York Times; June 2, 1927; "Maker Holds Faith in Byrd's Compass; Colvin Asserts It Was Tested and He Cannot Account for Reported Failure. Charles H. Colvin, President of the Pioneer Instrument Company of Brooklyn, manufacturer of the earth inductor compass used in all recent transatlantic flights, declared yesterday that the compass trouble experienced by Commander Richard E. Byrd of the America during the early part of his trip to France had been anticipated, but he expressed himself as somewhat bewildered by reports that the compasses had failed to function correctly during a large part of the flight."
The New York Times; August 11, 1933; "A leading New Jersey deal yesterday was the sale of an eight-acre property on Egbert Hill, Morristown, New Jersey, by the Morris County Savings Bank. The place was owned for some years by Livingston Whitney and later by Mrs. Roy C. Cool. It has now been purchased by Charles H. Colvin through Eugene V. Welsh, broker in the deal."
The New York Times; January 22, 1945; "Colvine Heads Air Group; Elected President of Institute of Aeronautical Sciences."
The New York Times; August 11, 1945; "Arthur E. Raymond of Santa Monica, California, vice president of the Douglas Aircraft Company, has been elected president of the Institute of the Aeronautical Sciences, 30 Rockefeller Plaza, for 1946, succeeding Charles H. Colvin of New York, it was announced yesterday."
The New York Times; July 14, 1985; Obituary

American aerospace engineers
1893 births
1985 deaths
People from Sterling, Massachusetts
20th-century American engineers